Guðrøðr is a masculine Old Norse personal name. The name is rendered in Old Irish and Middle Irish as Gofraid or Gofraidh (later Goraidh in Scottish Gaelic). Anglicised forms of the Old Norse name are Godred,  Guthred, and Guthfrith. The name is also Latinised as Godredus.

Persons with the name
Many of these are given in more than one spelling in various sources, and thus their article titles here are not consistent.
 Gudrød the Hunter (semi-legendary king in Vingulmark in south-east Norway, from 804 until 810)
 Gudrød Bjørnsson (ruled Vestfold until 968)
Godred Crovan (d. 1095), King of Dublin and the Isles
Guðrøðr Óláfsson (d. 1187), King of Dublin and the Isles
Guðrøðr Rǫgnvaldsson (d. 1231), King in the Isles
Gofraid mac Amlaíb meic Ragnaill (d. 1075), King of Dublin
Gofraid mac Arailt (d. 989), King of the Isles
Gofraid mac Sitriuc (d. 951), King of Dublin
Gofraid mac Sitriuc (d. 1070), King of Dublin, father of Fingal mac Gofraid
Gofraid ua Ímair (d. 934), King of Dublin and Northumbria
Guðrøðr Magnússon (fl. 1275), son of Magnús Óláfsson, King of Mann and the Isles
Guðröðr of Skåne, 7th-century Scanian king 
Guthred (d. 895), King of York

Other
Godred, the name of an engine on the Culdee Fell Railway in the stories of the Rev. W. Awdry